Cornucopia is an album by American jazz trumpeter Dizzy Gillespie featuring performances of popular songs recorded in 1969 and originally released on the Solid State label.

Track listing
 "Windmills of Your Mind" (Michel Legrand, Alan Bergman, Marilyn Bergman) - 3:07
 "My Cherie Amour" (Stevie Wonder, Henry Cosby, Sylvia Moy) - 3:23
 "Get Back" (John Lennon, Paul McCartney) - 2:36
 "Yesterday's Dream" (Don Sebesky) - 3:55
 "Lorraine" (Dizzy Gillespie) - 4:10
 "Ann, Wonderful One" (Charles Carpenter, Earl Hines) - 2:57
 "Love Theme from Romeo and Juliet" (Nino Rota) - 3:35
 "Oh Happy Day" (Edwin Hawkins) - 4:32
 "Tango-Rine" (Gillespie) - 3:20
 "Both Sides, Now" (Joni Mitchell) - 3:16

Personnel
Dizzy Gillespie, Lew Soloff - trumpet
Wayne Andre, Paul Faulise - trombone
Don Corrado, Earl Chapin - French horn
Jerome Richardson, Sol Schlinger, Stan Webb - woodwinds
Billy Butler, Carl Lynch, Bucky Pizzarelli - electric guitar
Mike Abene, Paul Griffin, Richard Tee - keyboards
Chuck Rainey - electric bass
Richard Davis - bass
Jack Jennings, Bill LaVorgna, Bernard Purdie, Ed Shaughnessy - drums, percussion
Unnamed string section arranged and conducted by Don Sebesky

References 

Solid State Records (jazz label) albums
Dizzy Gillespie albums
1970 albums
Albums arranged by Don Sebesky